Arend Friedrich August Wiegmann (2 June 1802 – 15 January 1841) was a German zoologist and herpetologist born in Braunschweig.

He studied medicine and philology at the University of Leipzig, and afterwards was an assistant to Martin Lichtenstein (1780–1857) in Berlin. In 1828 he became a professor at Cologne, and two years later was an extraordinary professor at the Friedrich Wilhelm University in Berlin.

Wiegmann specialized in the study of herpetology and mammalogy. In 1835, he founded, together with other scholars, the zoological periodical Archiv für Naturgeschichte, also known as "Wiegmann's Archive". With Johann Friedrich Ruthe (1788–1859) he wrote an important textbook of zoology called Handbuch der Zoologie, and in 1834 Wiegmann published Herpetologia Mexicana, a monograph on the reptiles of Mexico.

In 1841 he died of tuberculosis at the age of 38 in Berlin.

His father Arend Friedrich Wiegmann (1771–1853) a German researcher in botany.

Species described by Wiegmann
Of the many species of reptiles which he described, 55 species are still considered valid, among which are:

Gerrhonotus liocephalus in 1828
Heloderma horridum, the venomous Mexican beaded lizard, in 1829
Pelodiscus sinensis in 1834
Laemanctus longipes also in 1834
Scincus hemprichii in 1837

He also described several new species of amphibians.

Species named in honor of Wiegmann
Wiegmann is commemorated in the scientific names of three species of Reptiles:

Liolaemus wiegmannii 
Otocryptis wiegmanni 
Trogonophis wiegmanni

References

This article is based on a translation of an article from the French Wikipedia.

1802 births
1841 deaths
19th-century German zoologists
Scientists from Braunschweig
People from the Duchy of Brunswick
German herpetologists
Leipzig University alumni